Helohyidae were a group of artiodactyl mammals.
 They were most prominent in the mid-to-upper Eocene (~50 to 39 million years ago).

Description

Helohyidae share vague similarities to present-day pigs, though were slimmer in build. They possessed prominent canines and molars with bunodont cusps, bulging dental wreaths, and wrinkled enamel. Their upper molars were usually squared, due to the enlargement and displacement of the metaconule, but there was also a small hypocone and hypoconule. The paraconule was reduced and there was no mesostyle. Their lower molars increased in size as they proceeded to the bottom of the jaw, and the paraconid was small or absent. Some forms (e.g. Gobiohyus) possessed small diastemas that separated the premolars from each other. The snout was usually elongated (e.g. in Helohyus), but in some forms ascribed to this family (Achaenodon), it was very short. Compared to other primitive artiodactyls such as dichobunids, they possessed higher sagittal ridges; the genus Achaenodon, in particular, possessed a large sagittal crest and its size was much larger than those of other helohyids.

Classification
The family Helohyidae was established by Marshall in 1877 to accommodate some forms of early artiodactyl mammals of the American Eocene. In addition to the genus Helohyus, the North American Parahyus and Achaenodon were later ascribed to this family. Other forms come from the Upper-Middle-East Eocene of Asia (Gobiohyus of Inner Mongolia, Pakkokuhyus of Burma and Progenitohyus of Thailand. The latter form may be close to the origin of the family of hippo-like anthracotheres. The artiodactyl Simojovelhyus was once thought to be an unusually late-surviving genus of helohyid from the Upper Oligocene (extending the families temporal range by around 10 million years), however recent studies consider it a peccary.

Helohyids have been variously classified as relatives of archaic dichobunids or as close to the origin of anthracotheres. The current opinion is to classify them as relatives of the dichobunids.

References

Prehistoric mammal families